Rivers of Babylon is a 1998 Slovak comedy film directed by Vlado Balco. The film was selected as the Slovak entry for the Best Foreign Language Film at the 71st Academy Awards, but was not accepted as a nominee. The film is based on the 1991 novel of the same name by Peter Pišťanek.

Cast
 Andrej Hryc as Rácz
 Vladimír Hajdu as Video-Urban (as Ady Hajdu)
 Diana Mórová as Silvia
 Barbora Kodetová as Lenka (as Barbara Kodetová)
 Miro Noga as Driver Dula
 Lubo Gregor as Riaditel

See also
 List of submissions to the 71st Academy Awards for Best Foreign Language Film
 List of Slovak submissions for the Academy Award for Best Foreign Language Film

References

External links
 

1998 films
1998 comedy films
Slovak comedy films
Slovak-language films
Films based on Slovak novels